Sentence spacing concerns how spaces are inserted between sentences in typeset text and is a matter of typographical convention. Since the introduction of movable-type printing in Europe, various sentence spacing conventions have been used in languages with a Latin alphabet. These include a normal word space (as between the words in a sentence), a single enlarged space, and two full spaces.

Until the 20th century, publishing houses and printers in many countries used additional space between sentences. There were exceptions to this traditional spacing method—some printers used spacing between sentences that was no wider than word spacing. This was French spacing—a term synonymous with single-space sentence spacing until the late 20th century. With the introduction of the typewriter in the late 19th century, typists used two spaces between sentences to mimic the style used by traditional typesetters. While wide sentence spacing was phased out in the printing industry in the mid-20th century, the practice continued on typewriters and later on computers. Perhaps because of this, many modern sources now incorrectly claim that wide spacing was created for the typewriter.

The desired or correct sentence spacing is often debated, but some sources now claim that an additional space is not necessary. From around 1950, single sentence spacing became standard in books, magazines, and newspapers, and the majority of style guides that use a Latin-derived alphabet as a language base now prescribe or recommend the use of a single space after the concluding punctuation of a sentence. However, some sources still state that additional spacing is correct or acceptable. Some people preferred double sentence spacing because that was how they were taught to type. The few direct studies conducted since 2002 have produced inconclusive results as to which convention is more readable.

History

Traditional typesetting

Shortly after the invention of movable type, highly variable spacing was created, which could create spaces of any size and allowed for perfectly even justification. Early American, English, and other European typesetters' style guides (also known as printers' rules) specified spacing standards that were all essentially identical from the 18th century onwards. These guides—e.g., Jacobi in the UK (1890) and MacKellar, Harpel, and De Vinne (1866–1901) in the U.S.—indicated that sentences should be em-spaced, and that words should be 1/3 or 1/2 em-spaced. The relative size of the sentence spacing would vary depending on the size of the word spaces and the justification needs. For most countries, this remained the standard for published work until the 20th century. Yet, even in this period, there were publishing houses that used a standard word space between sentences.

Mechanical type and the advent of the typewriter
Mechanical type systems introduced near the end of the 19th century, such as the Linotype and Monotype machines, allowed for some variable sentence spacing similar to hand composition. Just as these machines revolutionized the mass production of text, the advent of the typewriter around the same time revolutionized the creation of personal and business documents. But the typewriters' mechanical limitations did not allow variable spacing—typists could only choose the number of times they pressed the space bar. Typists in some English-speaking countries initially learned to insert three spaces between sentences to approximate the wider sentence spacing used in traditional printing, but later settled on two spaces, a practice that continued throughout the 20th century. This became known as English spacing and marked a divergence from French typists, who continued to use French spacing.

Transition to single spacing
In the early 20th century, some printers began using one and a half interword spaces (an "en quad") to separate sentences. This standard continued in use, to some extent, into the 1990s.

Magazines, newspapers, and books began to adopt the single-space convention in the United States in the 1940s and in the United Kingdom in the 1950s. Typists did not move to single spacing simultaneously.

Technological advances began affecting sentence spacing methods. In 1941, IBM introduced the Executive, a typewriter capable of proportional spacing, which had been used in professional typesetting for hundreds of years. This innovation broke the hold that the monospaced font had on the typewriter, reducing the severity of its mechanical limitations. However, this innovation did not spread throughout the typewriter industry; the majority of mechanical typewriters, including all of the widely distributed models, remained monospaced, while a small minority of special models carried the innovations. By the 1960s, electronic phototypesetting systems ignored runs of white space in text. This was also true for the World Wide Web, as HTML normally ignores additional spacing, although in 2011 the CSS 2.1 standard officially added an option that can preserve additional spaces. In the 1980s, desktop publishing software provided the average writer with more advanced formatting tools.

Modern literature

Typography
Early positions on typography (the "arrangement and appearance of text") supported traditional spacing techniques in English publications. In 1954, Geoffrey Dowding's book Finer Points in the Spacing and Arrangement of Type underscored the widespread shift from a single enlarged em space to a standard word space between sentences.

With the advent of the computer age, typographers began deprecating double spacing, even in monospaced text. In 1989, Desktop Publishing by Design stated that "typesetting requires only one space after periods, question marks, exclamation points, and colons" and identified single sentence spacing as a typographic convention. Stop Stealing Sheep & Find Out How Type Works (1993) and Designing with Type: The Essential Guide to Typography (2006) both indicate that uniform spacing should be used between words, including between sentences.

More recent works on typography weigh in strongly. Ilene Strizver, founder of the Type Studio, says: "Forget about tolerating differences of opinion: typographically speaking, typing two spaces before the start of a new sentence is absolutely, unequivocally wrong." The Complete Manual on Typography (2003) states that "The typewriter tradition of separating sentences with two-word spaces after a period has no place in typesetting" and that the single space is "standard typographic practice". The Elements of Typographic Style (2004) advocates a single space between sentences, noting that "your typing as well as your typesetting will benefit from unlearning this quaint [double spacing] Victorian habit".

David Jury's book About Face: Reviving the Rules of Typography (2004)—published in Switzerland—clarifies the contemporary typographic position on sentence spacing:
Word spaces, preceding or following punctuation, should be optically adjusted to appear to be of the same value as a standard word space. If a standard word space is inserted after a full point or a comma, then, optically, this produces a space of up to 50% wider than that of other word spaces within a line of type. This is because these punctuation marks carry space above them, which, when added to the adjacent standard word spaces, combines to create a visually larger space. Some argue that the "additional" space after a comma and full point serves as a "pause signal" for the reader. But this is unnecessary (and visually disruptive) since the pause signal is provided by the punctuation mark itself.

Style and language guides

Style guides
Early style guides for typesetting used a wider space between sentences than between words—"traditional spacing", as shown in the illustration to the right. During the 20th century, style guides commonly mandated two spaces between sentences for typewritten manuscripts, which were used prior to professionally typesetting the work. As computer desktop publishing became commonplace, typewritten manuscripts became less relevant and most style guides stopped making distinctions between manuscripts and final typeset products. In the same period, style guides began changing their guidance on sentence spacing. The 1969 edition of the Chicago Manual of Style used em spaces between sentences in its text; by the 2003 edition it had changed to single sentence spacing for both manuscript and print. By the 1980s, the United Kingdom's Hart's Rules (1983) had shifted to single sentence spacing. Other style guides followed suit in the 1990s. Soon after the beginning of the 21st century, the majority of style guides had changed to indicate that only one word space was proper between sentences.

Modern style guides provide standards and guidance for the written language. These works are important to writers, since "virtually all professional editors work closely with one of them in editing a manuscript for publication". Late editions of comprehensive style guides, such as the Oxford Style Manual (2003) in the United Kingdom and the Chicago Manual of Style (2010) in the United States, provide standards for a wide variety of writing and design topics, including sentence spacing. The majority of style guides now prescribe the use of a single space after terminal punctuation in final written works and publications. A few style guides allow double sentence spacing for draft work, and the Gregg Reference Manual makes room for double and single sentence spacing based on author preferences. Web design guides do not usually provide guidance on this topic, as "HTML refuses to recognize double spaces altogether". These works themselves follow the current publication standard of single sentence spacing.

The European Union's Interinstitutional Style Guide (2008) indicates that single sentence spacing is to be used in all European Union publications—encompassing 23 languages. For the English language, the European Commission's English Style Guide (2010) states that sentences are always single-spaced. The Style Manual: For Authors, Editors and Printers (2007), first published in 1966 by the Commonwealth Government Printing Office of Australia, stipulates that only one space is used after "sentence-closing punctuation" and that "Programs for word processing and desktop publishing offer more sophisticated, variable spacing, so this practice of double spacing is now avoided because it can create distracting gaps on a page."

National languages not covered by an authoritative language academy typically have multiple style guides, only some of which may discuss sentence spacing. This is the case in the United Kingdom. The Oxford Style Manual (2003) and the Modern Humanities Research Association's MHRA Style Guide (2002) state that only single spacing should be used. In Canada, both the English- and French-language sections of the Canadian Style, A Guide to Writing and Editing (1997), prescribe single sentence spacing. In the United States, many style guides—such as the Chicago Manual of Style (2003)—allow only single sentence spacing.

Language guides
Some languages, such as French and Spanish, have academies that set language rules. Their publications typically address orthography and grammar as opposed to matters of typography. Style guides are less relevant for such languages, as their academies set prescriptive rules. The 1992 edition does not provide guidance on sentence spacing, but is single-sentence-spaced throughout—consistent with historical French spacing. The Spanish language is similar. The 2001 edition does not provide sentence-spacing guidance, but is itself single-sentence-spaced. The German language manual  ("Recommendations of the Council for German Orthography"; 2006) does not address sentence spacing. The manual itself uses one space after terminal punctuation. Additionally, the Duden, the German-language dictionary most commonly used in Germany, indicates that double sentence spacing is an error.

Grammar guides
A few reference grammars address sentence spacing, as increased spacing between words is punctuation in itself. Most do not. Grammar guides typically cover terminal punctuation and the proper construction of sentences—but not the spacing between sentences. Moreover, many modern grammar guides are designed for quick reference and refer users to comprehensive style guides for additional matters of writing style. For example, the Pocket Idiot's Guide to Grammar and Punctuation (2005) points users to style guides such as the MLA Style Manual for consistency in formatting work and for all other "editorial concerns". The Grammar Bible (2004) states that "The modern system of English punctuation is by no means simple. A book that covers all the bases would need to be of considerable breadth and weight and anyone interested in such a resource is advised to consult the Chicago Manual of Style."

Computer era

In the computer era, spacing between sentences is handled in several different ways by various software packages. Some systems accept whatever the user types, while others attempt to alter the spacing or use the user input as a method of detecting sentences. Computer-based word processors and typesetting software such as troff and TeX allow users to arrange text in a manner previously only available to professional typesetters.

The text-editing environment in Emacs uses a double space following a period to identify the end of sentences unambiguously; the double-space convention prevents confusion with periods within sentences that signify abbreviations. How Emacs recognizes the end of a sentence is controlled by the settings sentence-end-double-space and sentence-end.

The Unix typesetter program Troff uses two spaces to mark the end of a sentence. This allows the typesetter to distinguish sentence endings from abbreviations and to typeset them differently. Early versions of Troff, which only typeset in fixed-width fonts, would automatically add a second space between sentences, which were detected based on the combination of terminal punctuation and a line feed.

In the April 2020 update, Microsoft Word started highlighting two spaces after a period as an error and offers a correction of one space.

Multiple spaces are eliminated by default in most World Wide Web content, whether or not they are associated with sentences. There are options for preserving spacing, such as the CSS white-space property, and the <pre> tag.

Controversy
James Felici, author of the Complete Manual of Typography, says that the topic of sentence spacing is "the debate that refuses to die ... In all my years of writing about type, it's still the question I hear most often, and a search of the web will find threads galore on the subject."

Many people are opposed to single sentence spacing for various reasons. Some state that the habit of double spacing is too deeply ingrained to change. Others claim that additional space between sentences improves the aesthetics or readability of text. Proponents of double sentence spacing also state that some publishers may still require double-spaced manuscript submissions from authors. A key example noted is the screenwriting industry's monospaced standard for screenplay manuscripts, Courier, 12-point font, although some works on screenwriting indicate that Courier is merely preferred—proportional fonts may be used. Some reliable sources state simply that writers should follow their particular style guide, but proponents of double spacing caution that publishers' guidance takes precedence, including those that ask for double-sentence-spaced manuscripts.

One of the most popular arguments against wider sentence spacing is that it was created for monospaced fonts of the typewriter and is no longer needed with modern proportional fonts.
However, proportional fonts existed together with wide sentence spacing for centuries before the typewriter and remained for decades after its invention. When the typewriter was first introduced, typists were most commonly taught to use three spaces between sentences. This gradually shifted to two spaces, while the print industry remained unchanged in its wide em-spaced sentences. Some sources now state it is acceptable for monospaced fonts to be single-spaced today, although other references continue to specify double spacing for monospaced fonts. The double-space typewriter convention has been taught in schools in typing classes and remains the practice in many cases. Some voice concern that students will later be forced to relearn how to type.

Most style guides indicate that single sentence spacing is proper for final or published work today, and most publishers require manuscripts to be submitted as they will appear in publication—with single sentence spacing. Writing sources typically recommend that prospective authors remove extra spaces before submitting manuscripts, although other sources state that publishers will use software to remove the spaces before final publication.

Effects on readability and legibility

Claims abound regarding the legibility and readability of the single and double sentence spacing methods—by proponents on both sides. Supporters of single spacing assert that familiarity with the current standard in books, magazines, and the Web enhances readability, that double spacing looks strange in text using proportional fonts, and that the "rivers" and "holes" caused by double spacing impair readability. Proponents of double sentence spacing state that the extra space between sentences enhances readability by providing clearer breaks between sentences and making text appear more legible.

However, typographic opinions are typically anecdotal with no basis in evidence. "Opinions are not always safe guides to legibility of print", and when direct studies are conducted, anecdotal opinions—even those of experts—can turn out to be false. Text that seems legible (visually pleasing at first glance) may be shown to actually impair reading effectiveness when subjected to scientific study.

Studies
Direct studies on sentence spacing include those by Loh, Branch, Shewanown, and Ali (2002); and Clinton, Branch, Holschuh, and Shewanown (2003); with results favoring neither single, double, nor triple spacing. The 2002 study tested participants' reading speed for passages of on-screen text with single and double sentence spacing. The authors stated that "the 'double space group' consistently took longer time to finish than the 'single space' group" but concluded that "there was not enough evidence to suggest that a significant difference exists". The 2003 study analyzed on-screen single, double, and triple spacing. In both cases, the authors stated that there was insufficient evidence to draw a conclusion. Ni, Branch, Chen, and Clinton conducted a similar study in 2009 using identical spacing variables. The authors concluded that the "results provided insufficient evidence that time and comprehension differ significantly among different conditions of spacing between sentences". A 2018 study of 60 students found that those who used two word spaces between sentences read the same text 3 percent faster than with a monospaced font (Courier New).

See also
 Leading
 Scriptio continua

Notes and references

Bibliography

Further reading

External links
 
 
 
 
 
 

Punctuation
Typography
Whitespace